Olga Gere-Pulić (Serbian Cyrillic: Олга Гере-Пулић; born September 27, 1942, in Novi Sad, Yugoslavia) is a former Yugoslav high jumper.

She won first medal for Yugoslavia at the European Athletics Championships, silver in 1962. Gere represented Yugoslavia at the 1960 and 1964 Summer Olympics where she was placed 7th.

References 

 Olga Gere-Pulic, Profile on sports-reference

1942 births
Living people
Sportspeople from Novi Sad
Serbian female high jumpers
Yugoslav female high jumpers
Olympic female high jumpers
Olympic athletes of Yugoslavia
Athletes (track and field) at the 1960 Summer Olympics
Athletes (track and field) at the 1964 Summer Olympics
European Athletics Championships medalists
Japan Championships in Athletics winners